A country doctor is (or was) a physician who works with a rural health focus, out in the country. In many regions the town-and-country distinction no longer corresponds to large differences in practice patterns.

Country Doctor as the title of a work may refer to:

Fiction
 A Country Doctor (novel), an 1884 novel by Sarah Orne Jewett
 "A Country Doctor" (short story), a 1919 short story  by Franz Kafka
 "A Country Doctor" (short story collection), a 1919 collection of short stories by Franz Kafka
 Le Médecin de campagne (English: The Country Doctor), an 1833 novel by Honoré de Balzac

Film
 The Country Doctor (1909 film), a film directed by D.W. Griffith
 The Country Doctor (1927 film), directed by Rupert Julian
 The Country Doctor (1936 film), directed by Henry King
 A Country Doctor (film), a 2007 animated film directed by Koji Yamamura, based on the Kafka story
 Médecin de campagne,  a 2016 French film, released under two English titles, The Country Doctor and  Irreplaceable

Music
 "Country Doctor", a song on the album Hot House (Bruce Hornsby album)